The George W. Maher House is a historic house at 424 Warwick Road in Kenilworth, Illinois, USA. The architect George W. Maher built the house in 1893 for himself and his wife. His design was influenced by the Arts and Crafts movement and is an early example of a house with Prairie School elements. The house has a massive rectangular form and features a porch with decorative woodwork, several projecting bays, and a variety of window shapes. Its large hip roof with multiple dormers and pinnacles is characteristic of Maher's earliest designs.

The house was added to the National Register of Historic Places on March 21, 1979.

References

Houses on the National Register of Historic Places in Cook County, Illinois
Prairie School architecture in Illinois
Arts and Crafts architecture in Illinois
Houses completed in 1893
Kenilworth, Illinois